Wilhelm Riphahn (also Wilhelm Riphan; born 25 July 1889 in Cologne – 27 December 1963 in Cologne) was a German architect.

Riphahn studied at the technical universities in Berlin-Charlottenburg, Munich, and Karlsruhe. He worked for a Siemens construction office in Berlin and in 1912 for "Gebrüder Taut & Hoffmann". In 1913 Riphahn became an independent architect and worked with Caspar Maria Grod until 1931. Some of his more well-known works include the Bastei restaurant and the Cologne opera house.

Riphahn is buried in Cologne's Melaten cemetery.

Literature 
 Heinrich de Fries (Einl.): Wilhelm Riphahn. F. E. Hübsch, Berlin, Leipzig, Wien 1927.
 als Nachdruck: Gebr. Mann, Berlin 1996, . (mit einem Nachwort zur Neuausgabe von Wolfram Hagspiel)
 Wolfram Hagspiel: Der Kölner Architekt Wilhelm Riphahn. Sein Lebenswerk von 1913 bis 1945. König, Köln 1982, . [Zugl.: Köln, Univ., Diss.: 1981.]
 Werner Mantz. Architekturphotographie in Köln 1926–1932. Ausstellungskatalog, Museum Ludwig Köln, Köln 1982.
 Clemens Klemmer: Der Kölner Architekt Wilhelm Riphahn (1889–1963). In: Werk, Bauen+Wohnen, 76. / 43. Jahrgang 1989, Heft 3, S. 72 und 74 (mit Literaturangaben).
 Wilhelm Riphahn, Architekt in Köln. Eine Bestandsaufnahme. [anlässlich der Ausstellung Wilhelm Riphahn – Architekt in Köln im Museum für Angewandte Kunst Köln vom 18. September 2004 bis 2. Februar 2005; Katalog] / hrsg. vom Museum für Angewandte Kunst Köln. Britta Funck. Mit Beiträgen von Gudrun Escher, Monika Läuferts und Texten von Wilhelm Riphahn. König, Köln 2004, .

20th-century German architects
Technical University of Munich alumni
1889 births
1963 deaths
Architects from Cologne
Burials in Germany